Gravelbourg is a former provincial electoral district  for the Legislative Assembly of the province of Saskatchewan, Canada. This district was created before the 5th Saskatchewan general election in 1921. Redrawn and renamed "Assiniboia-Gravelbourg" in 1975, the riding was dissolved before the 23rd Saskatchewan general election in 1995.

It is now part of the Wood River constituency.

Members of the Legislative Assembly

Gravelbourg (1921–1975)

Assiniboia-Gravelbourg (1975 – 1995)

Election results

|-

| style="width: 130px" |Independent
|William James Cummings
|align="right"|2,582
|align="right"|52.77%
|align="right"|–

|- bgcolor="white"
!align="left" colspan=3|Total
!align="right"|4,893
!align="right"|100.00%
!align="right"|

|-

|- bgcolor="white"
!align="left" colspan=3|Total
!align="right"|3,797
!align="right"|100.00%
!align="right"|

|-

 
|Conservative
|George William Stuart Eisnor
|align="right"|2,391
|align="right"|40.70%
|align="right"|–
|- bgcolor="white"
!align="left" colspan=3|Total
!align="right"|5,874
!align="right"|100.00%
!align="right"|

|-

 
|Conservative
|Henry J. Coutu
|align="right"|1,642
|align="right"|27.91%
|align="right"|-12.79

|Farmer-Labour
|Richard Pennington Sinkinson
|align="right"|1,065
|align="right"|18.10%
|align="right"|–
|- bgcolor="white"
!align="left" colspan=3|Total
!align="right"|5,884
!align="right"|100.00%
!align="right"|

|-

 
|CCF
|Frank Keem Malcolm
|align="right"|1,495
|align="right"|31.10%
|align="right"|+13.00
|- bgcolor="white"
!align="left" colspan=3|Total
!align="right"|4,807
!align="right"|100.00%
!align="right"|

|-

|- bgcolor="white"
!align="left" colspan=3|Total
!align="right"|5,885
!align="right"|100.00%
!align="right"|

|-
 
| style="width: 130px" |CCF
|Henry E. Houze
|align="right"|2,681
|align="right"|50.90%
|align="right"|-

|- bgcolor="white"
!align="left" colspan=3|Total
!align="right"|5,267
!align="right"|100.00%
!align="right"|

|-

 
|CCF
|Henry E. Houze
|align="right"|2,525
|align="right"|43.06%
|align="right"|-7.84

|- bgcolor="white"
!align="left" colspan=3|Total
!align="right"|5,864
!align="right"|100.00%
!align="right"|

|-
 
| style="width: 130px" |CCF
|Edward H. Walker
|align="right"|2,571
|align="right"|50.76%
|align="right"|+7.70

|- bgcolor="white"
!align="left" colspan=3|Total
!align="right"|5,065
!align="right"|100.00%
!align="right"|

|-
 
| style="width: 130px" |CCF
|Edward H. Walker
|align="right"|2,861
|align="right"|47.16%
|align="right"|-3.60

|- bgcolor="white"
!align="left" colspan=3|Total
!align="right"|6,067
!align="right"|100.00%
!align="right"|

|-

 
|CCF
|Edward H. Walker
|align="right"|2,309
|align="right"|40.09%
|align="right"|-7.07

|- bgcolor="white"
!align="left" colspan=3|Total
!align="right"|5,760
!align="right"|100.00%
!align="right"|

|-

 
|CCF
|Thomas Donahue
|align="right"|2,188
|align="right"|35.89%
|align="right"|-4.20

 
|Prog. Conservative
|Charles J. T. James
|align="right"|429
|align="right"|7.04%
|align="right"|-
|- bgcolor="white"
!align="left" colspan=3|Total
!align="right"|6,096
!align="right"|100.00%
!align="right"|

|-

 
|CCF
|Roland LeBlanc
|align="right"|2,448
|align="right"|44.94%
|align="right"|+9.05
|- bgcolor="white"
!align="left" colspan=3|Total
!align="right"|5,447
!align="right"|100.00%
!align="right"|

|-

 
|NDP
|Norman Allan
|align="right"|1,860
|align="right"|38.65%
|align="right"|-6.29
 
|Prog. Conservative
|Keith Muckelt
|align="right"|567
|align="right"|11.78%
|align="right"|-
|- bgcolor="white"
!align="left" colspan=3|Total
!align="right"|4,812
!align="right"|100.00%
!align="right"|

|-
 
| style="width: 130px" |NDP
|Reg Gross
|align="right"|2,399
|align="right"|50.46%
|align="right"|+11.81

|- bgcolor="white"
!align="left" colspan=3|Total
!align="right"|4,754
!align="right"|100.00%
!align="right"|

See also
Electoral district (Canada)
List of Saskatchewan provincial electoral districts
List of Saskatchewan general elections
List of political parties in Saskatchewan

References
 

Former provincial electoral districts of Saskatchewan